C&D or C and D or variation, may refer to:

 Cease and desist, an order to stop an activity
 C&D (Creativity & Development), French-Japanese animation firm started by Jean Chalopin, DIC Entertainment founder
 C&D Aerospace, part of the French corporation Zodiac Aerospace 
 C&D Canal, a ship canal connecting the Delaware River with Chesapeake Bay in the United States
 C&D International Plaza, the tallest building in Xiamen, China as of 2013
 C&D waste, waste from construction and demolition
 Car and Driver, a U.S. automotive magazine
 C and D -class destroyer, British Royal Navy interwar destroyers
 construction and demolition

See also

 C and D Canal, USA
 CND (disambiguation)
 CD (disambiguation)
 C (disambiguation)
 D (disambiguation)
 D&C (disambiguation)